Polar Storm (also known as Pole Reversal) is a 2009 American-Canadian made-for-television science fiction-disaster-thriller film that is directed by Paul Ziller and was aired on Sci-Fi Channel on March 28, 2009. The film focuses on the Earth suffering a reversal of polarity, caused by the impact of the comet's fragment in Northern Alaska that sets off its cataclysmic, electromagnetic polar reversal storm.

Plot 
In a dark television news studio, news anchor Lou Vanetti broadcasts as Earth approaches the final hours leading to Earth's magnetic field disappearing. Cynthia and her stepson Shane pass through a deserted Lindenville, Washington during the electromagnetic storm, only for the former to be "swallowed" into the ground after an earthquake. One week earlier, Lou discusses the comet Copernicus' path with Doctor James Mayfield, an astrologist and astrophysicist from the Storm Hazards Department (SHD). A piece of Copernicus splits off on a collision course for Earth. James' colleague Pam tries to warn James and his colleague Peter in North Alaska that the fragment will land not far from them, but interference cuts her off.

The comet's fragment hits Northern Alaska, generating the shock wave blast bringing severe damage to Canada, Alaska, and the Russian Far East. Peter is among the quarter-million dead, while James Mayfield survives because he took cover in an avalanche bunker. He returns home to Lindenville and is displeased by the President's speech because of his near-death experience. While at home, their television set suddenly emits static, followed by an unknown tremor.

Recognizing the Earth's tremor preceded by the EM disturbance, he tries to log into SHD to review the data Peter uploaded during the comet's impact. His access is blocked, its data classified by the administration, following the gag order of the whole department. He continues regardless as he becomes more suspicious when the sun unexpectedly sets at Eagle Peak.

James' son, Shane, meets Zoe and Kevin at the park, where the latter challenges Shane in drag racing to settle a dispute over who repays the damage to a telescope they broke during a fight earlier that night. As they prepare for a drag race, an electromagnetic interference suddenly occurs, followed by an earthquake that swallows Kevin and his car. Shane and Zoe make a run from the park. At the same time, James explains in an interview with Vanetti about the misalignment of the Earth's axis due to a sudden axis tilt following the cataclysmic events in Alaska. James' findings have received enormous attention. As a result of violating the gag order and U.S. government-imposed censorship, he was being called by his father, General Mayfield, to report to the Gilboy Air Base. James tries to warn the President and Doctor Elman of the consequences of the Earth's axis shft, but they dismissed him and his findings.

Later, a 40 Khz electromagnetic pulse tears through Lindenville and the world, resulting in a blackout knocking out communications and killing anyone inside buildings, cars, and while using electronics. The President declares martial law throughout the United States and orders all civilians to evacuate to emergency shelters. James instructs his family to leave Lindenville and head to Little Brook, a town 40 miles away. While on the road, members of the U.S. Army force Cynthia and Shane to turn back and take shelter in a parish.

Returning to Lindenville, they find their road blocked. An EMP shock wave and an earthquake force Shane and Cynthia to run on foot, narrowly surviving the tremor after the crevice nearly swallows Cynthia before making their way to the Lindenville Parish. She tries to persuade the people inside and the General in charge to evacuate, but they refuse. Only Michael and Zoe leave the Lindenville Parish with Cynthia and Shane before the electromagnetic shockwave fries everyone inside.

While heading for Little Brook, Michael dies of a heart attack after the EMP wave disabled his pacemaker and after a looter's death by electrocution by the shockwave as he tried to steal Michael's SUV. Despite the vehicle being fried, Shane turns it back on by using the EMP wave to ignite the spark plugs and start the engine. At the same time, James and General Mayfield, along with the Russian Navy Captain Yulenkov and his submarine crew, dive and head towards the Mariana Trench in a plan to bring the planet back into regular axis tilt by dropping two nuclear warheads into the bottom of the trench, however, they are aware that the diesel-powered submarine; the one necessary for the operation as it remains functional even with the EMP shockwave, might not outrun the nuclear blast on time given its slow speed, making it a suicide mission.

After dropping the warheads and the crew preparing for the inevitable death, James points out and uses the underwater volcanic geyser for the submarine to propel themselves back up to the surface right as the warheads detonate. The combined efforts between Russia and the United States ultimately became a success, nearly risking the lives of the crew but saving the Earth.

The film ends with James Mayfield returning home in Lindenville, and introducing Shane to his grandfather.

Cast
 Jack Coleman as Dr. James Mayfield, a government astrologist & astrophysicist working for the Storm Hazards Research Lab.
 Holly Elissa Dignard as Cynthia Mayfield, Shane's stepmother, and science teacher.
 Tyler Johnston as Shane Mayfield, James' son.
 Terry David Mulligan as General Mayfield, James' father, who works at the Gilboy Air Base.
 Roger Cross as the President of the United States
 David Lewis as Lou Vanetti, local News anchor in Lindenville working in KJRX.
 Rob Morton as Michael
 Emma Lahana as Zoe, Kevin's girlfriend
 Nicholas Carrera as Peter, James' colleague from the Storm Hazards Department, who was killed by the blast from the comet's impact in Alaska.
 Marsha Regis as Pam, working in the Storm Hazards Research Lab.
 Jay Brazeau as Dr. Elman.
 Scott Lyster as Kevin, Shane's classmate who got into an altercation and was killed at the park during an astronomically agitated earthquake.
 Dean Redman as Sergeant
 Kurt Max Runte as Russian Navy Captain Yulenkov
 Brent Stait as Guard Captain 
 Donovan Cerminara as a U.S. Army Soldier at a roadblock, who ordered Cynthia to turn back and take shelter in the church, despite Cynthia's pleas to flee Lindenville.
 Darren Moore as Looter, who tried to steal Michael's SUV before being fried by the EMP shockwave.

Critical reception 

Radio Times gave it 1 out of 5 stars, and called it an "ineffectual, made-for-TV disaster movie".

Home media release
The film was released on DVD by First Look Home Entertainment on February 9, 2010.

See also
 List of disaster films

References

External links 
 
 

2009 television films
2009 films
Disaster television films
Syfy original films
American disaster films
American science fiction television films
Canadian disaster films
Canadian science fiction thriller films
Canadian science fiction television films
CineTel Films films
Comets in film
English-language Canadian films
Films about fictional presidents of the United States
Films set in Alaska
Films set in Washington (state)
2000s disaster films
2000s science fiction thriller films
Films about impact events
American science fiction thriller films
Films directed by Paul Ziller
2000s American films
2000s Canadian films